MTVX was a Viacom-owned American hard rock music video channel. MTVX was available exclusively on digital cable providers, being the first network made available in the "MTV Networks Digital Suite".

Format 
MTVX aired no advertising outside of MTV2 promos, airing videos on a daily loop programmed to air in three eight-hour blocks per day. The channel aired contemporary videos and older videos that were no longer shown on MTV. Likewise, MTVX was not limited to just one genre of rock music videos. The channel aired a variety of genres, including punk, metal, and grunge.

Also, MTVX showcased otherwise unknown or unheard music to the masses, such as Static-X, Disturbed, Finger Eleven, Black Label Society, SOiL, Soulfly, Sepultura, Tool, Pantera, Kittie, Dope, Coal Chamber, Primus, Mushroomhead and others.

Closure 
MTVX ended on May 1, 2002, and was replaced by MTV Jams, a hip hop music video channel. The last video played on MTVX was "See You On The Other Side" by Ozzy Osbourne. The replacement of MTVX was decried by rock music fans. MTV's explanation, based upon ratings and Billboard chart information, was that viewers wanted a devoted network for hip hop and R&B videos, rather than the alternative rock and hard rock videos that MTVX had been created to play, and claims that hard rock formats went into a quick decline post-9/11 due to industry and radio de-emphasis.

Reuse of brand 

In 2011 MTV began reusing the MTVX brand (with X standing here for 'extended') for "a new cross-media group in charge of developing content for various platforms such as TV, computers and mobile phones." MTV launched MTVX in August The effort never resulted in any actual product or program branded by MTVX, though the brand name of MTVX remained present on MTV's official corporate page for several years.

References 

MTV channels
Defunct television networks in the United States
Television channels and stations established in 1998
Television channels and stations disestablished in 2002